(Robert) Anthony Daniels (born June 18, 1957)is a Canadian prelate of the Roman Catholic Church.He is the 9th Bishop of the Roman Catholic Diocese of Grand Falls, Newfoundland, Canada, succeeding Archbishop Martin Currie, 67, who had been the Bishop of the diocese in addition to being Archbishop of his own archdiocese, the Metropolitan Archdiocese of St. John's, Newfoundland.

Biography

Early life

Daniels was born on June 18, 1957, in Windsor, Ontario. He was educated early on at St. Mary Goretti Elementary School, followed by St. Louis Senior and F.J. Brennan High School.

Career

Daniels attended St. Peter's Seminary where he received a master of divinity degree from the University of Western Ontario.

 7 May 1983 - Ordained to the priesthood in the Diocese of London 
Appointed Assistant Priest - St. John the Divine, London, 1983
Appointed Assistant Priest - St. Peter's Cathedral, 1986
Appointed Chancellor, Diocese of London, 1989
Appointed Vicar General, Diocese of London 1992
 2001-2004 - served as pastor of St. Columban RC Parish. St. Columban, Ontario (parish within the Diocese of London)
 21 September 2004 - Appointed Auxiliary Bishop of London, Ontario, Canada 
 21 September 2004 - Appointed titular Bishop of Scebatiana 
 9 November 2004 - Consecrated titular Bishop of Scebatiana 
 1 March 2011 - Appointed Bishop of the Roman Catholic Diocese of Grand Falls, Newfoundland, Canada
Installed April 11, 2011 as Bishop of Grand Falls

Until his appointment to that see by Pope Benedict XVI, on Tuesday, March 1, 2011, he had been Auxiliary Bishop of the Diocese of London, Ontario, Canada. While in his former post, he had been the titular bishop of Scebatiana. Bishop Daniels was consecrated bishop on Tuesday, November 9, 2004, at St. Peter’s Cathedral in London, Ontario. He was first appointed by the Pope John Paul II to be Auxiliary Bishop in the Diocese of London and Titular Bishop of Scebatiana. John Paul II had made this announcement on September 21, 2004.

See also
 Roman Catholic Diocese of London, Ontario
 St. Peter’s Cathedral Basilica
 St. Peter's Seminary
 Roman Catholic Diocese of Grand Falls

References

1957 births
Roman Catholic bishops of Grand Falls
Living people
University of Western Ontario alumni
People from Windsor, Ontario
St. Peter's Seminary (Diocese of London, Ontario) alumni